Ptolemy, also known as Ptolémée, Ptolomeus or Ptolemaeus, was the 8th Bishop of Lyon. He succeeded Jules in the second half of the 3rd century.

Little is known about his life. His name is known from the various lists of the first archbishops of Lyon and chronicles the history of the Church of Lyon. He is quoted in a catalog of the Abbey of Île Barbe. He is also the last bishop of Lyon to have a Greek name; the early Christian community of Lyons originally had strong links with Asia Minor which gradually disappeared with the development of Christianity in Gaul.

References 

Bishops of Lyon
3rd-century bishops in Gaul
Year of birth unknown
Year of death missing